Branimir Jovančićević (born 15 April 1962) is a Serbian politician who has been a member of the National Assembly since 1 August 2022. He is also a professor at the Faculty of Chemistry of University of Belgrade.

Early life 
Jovančićević was born on 15 April 1962 in Užice, PR Serbia, FPR Yugoslavia. He finished primary and secondary education in his hometown, while he earned his doctorate at the University of Belgrade.

Career 
Jovančićević has worked at the Faculty of Chemistry of University of Belgrade since 1989. He was promoted to the position of a professor in 2003.

He has been a member of the Democratic Party since 2004. He has been the vice president of DS since 2021.

He took part in the 2022 Serbian parliamentary election on the United for the Victory of Serbia list and was successfully elected member of the National Assembly.

Personal life 
He is a member of the Serbian Chemistry Society.

References 

1962 births
Living people
Politicians from Užice
Democratic Party (Serbia) politicians
Members of the National Assembly (Serbia)
University of Belgrade alumni
University of Belgrade people